is a 12 episode anime series, produced by Nomad, that aired on WOWOW from April 12, 2006 to July 19, 2006. It has been aired by the anime television network Animax across its networks worldwide, including its English language premiere in Southeast Asia, starting from October 2007 and ended in November 2007.

Plot
Himeko Tsubaki bumps into a pair of thieves called Leslie and Karen. She accidentally takes one of their bags containing a magic crown. Placing the crown on her head will magically turn her into a princess, and eventually fulfilling all of her wishes.

Her classmates and teachers believe her to be a princess, but she becomes a target of various people who want the crown for themselves. Tagging along is the true owner of the crown, a child princess named Nana.

Characters
  
 She's your typical Xenophobic girl who happens to find a magical crown that belongs to Nana. She likes to eat, and has the habit of misunderstanding things. Named Christie Tsubaki in the Animax dub.
  
 Nana is the girl that keeps following Himeko around, and though no-one understands her, in the later episodes she manages to say something to Karen, Leslie and Himeko.  She owns the crown Himeko is wearing.
 
 Banana is a monkey, and a pet of Nana. Banana often makes trouble, even stealing Leslie's underpants.
  
 Sobana is Himeko's best friend with this sock puppet shaped like a cat (assuming cat-like intonations in the process). She was once locked up in prison, when she was caught wearing gloves as the law forbids them to wear gloves. She is named "Winnie" in the Animax dub.
  
 Aoi is perfect in school. She constantly hates Himeko since she misunderstands Aoi on poisoning Nana, which Nana caught when Aoi slipped, making Nana choke, and has vanished temporarily. She helped Karen and Leslie once. Named Prefect Maple in the Animax dub.
  
 Himeko's teacher at school. She often fights with Aoi, and she is the reason why Chief X has been following Himeko around. Named Marie (Often mispronounced by various characters as 'Marian".) in the Animax dub.
  
 Ebine is Himeko's mother.
  
 Sanjūrō is Himeko's father, who often sleeps while seated in the toilet due to all-nighters (because he is a policeman).
  
 A professional thief. Karen knew Leslie since their childhood. Named Helen in the Animax dub.
  
 A professional thief. Leslie is best friends with Karen. Named Louise in the Animax dub.
  
 An assassin whose mission is to kill Himeko to get her crown--a mission he cannot fulfill because he has developed a crush on her.  Named Alan in the Animax dub.

Episode list

Production

Staff
 Director: Shigehito Takayanagi
 Episode director: Yuki Nanoka (ep 8)
 Original work: Shigehito Takayanagi
 Original character design: Mitsue
 Character design: Makoto Koga
 Color design: Hiroko Umezaki
 Art director: Kazuya Fukuda
 Editing: Bun Hida
 Director of photography: Yumiko Morimoto
 Music: Katsuyuki Harada
 Music producer: Yoshiyuki Ito
 Sound director: Yoshikazu Iwanami
 Sound effects: Minoru Yamada

Music

Opening Theme
 百発百中とらぶるん♪ (Hyappatsu Hyakuchū Toraburun♪)
 Lyrics by: Aki Hata
 Composition by: Shinji Tamura
 Arrangement by: Masaki Suzuki
 Song by: Ryōko Shintani and Ui Miyazaki

Ending Theme
 CANDY☆POP☆SWEET☆HEART
 Lyrics, Composition and Arrangement by: R·O·N
 Song by: Ryōko Shintani
 Music by: PINK BAMBI

Note: Ryōko Shintani and Ui Miyazaki sang the theme songs under the name of Himeko Tsubaki and Nana.

Note

External links
 Official website 
 WOWOW's website for Hime-sama Goyōjin
 

Fantasy anime and manga
Nomad (company)
Anime with original screenplays
Wowow original programming